Mario Ageno (March 2, 1915 – December 23, 1992) is considered one of Italy's most important biophysicists.

Early life and education
Born in Livorno from a Genoese family, he studied Physics for two years in Genoa, when one of his professors noticed his talent as a scientist, and suggested that he should move to Rome. He did, and from 1934 started collaborating with the "Via Panisperna boys" on nuclear physics and cosmic rays; the former became the subject of his graduation thesis under the supervision of Enrico Fermi, in 1936. He was one of the last Italian students to study under Fermi before Fermi emigrated to the United States. In 1938 he was recruited to work with Edoardo Amaldi on the first Italian particle accelerator.

Career
Aged 21, Ageno was selected to work with the "Via Panisperna boys" during their final years; when World War II broke out, he was drafted and fought in Libya. In 1949, he moved to the Physics department at the Istituto Superiore di Sanità, under the direction of Giulio Trabacchi, whom he succeeded in the position of head of department in 1959. With the collaboration of Franco Graziosi, he devoted the activities of the department to biophysics.

Thanks to his collaboration with Adriano Buzzati-Traverso, Ageno taught at the University of Pavia in 1960-1961, and became a member of the first scientific council of Traverso's Laboratorio Internazionale di Genetica e Biofisica. He left the Istituto Superiore di Sanità for the University of Rome La Sapienza in 1969, to accept the first professorship in Biophysics in Italian history. Becoming famed for his strictness with students, he continued his research in the university setting, focusing on mathematical and physical models for bacterial growth, developing a complex view on the relationships between physics and biology, which are summed up in his book Che cos'è la vita? In occasione del cinquantenario di What Is Life? di Erwin Schrödinger (Italian for "What Is life? In the occasion of the fiftieth anniversary of What Is Life? by Erwin Schrödinger). During his career, he authored about three hundred published scientific works and a handful of divulgative books, became a member of the Accademia dei Lincei, and was awarded an honorary degree in Biology.

Retirement and death
Mario Ageno retired in 1985, and died suddenly on December 23, 1992. His papers (54 boxes) are held by the Physics Department of the Università di Roma "La Sapienza". There is a street named after him in Rome.

Publications

M. Ageno, Methods and problems in biophysics. Riv. Nuovo Cim. 14, 1–71 (1991). https://doi.org/10.1007/BF02810146

External links
 Tribute to Mario Ageno (in Italian)
 Mario Ageno by Mauro Murzi (in Italian)
 Chapter 1 - Mario Ageno from Masters and students in italian physics by Luisa Bonolis (in Italian)

References

1915 births
1992 deaths
Italian biophysicists
20th-century Italian physicists
Burials at the Cimitero Flaminio